The 2016 United States presidential election in Tennessee was held on November 8, 2016, as part of the 2016 General Election in which all 50 states plus the District of Columbia participated. Tennessee voters chose electors to represent them in the Electoral College via a popular vote pitting the Republican Party's nominee, businessman Donald Trump, and running mate Indiana Governor Mike Pence against Democratic Party nominee, former Secretary of State Hillary Clinton and her running mate, Virginia Senator Tim Kaine.

On March 1, 2016, in the presidential primaries, Tennessee voters expressed their preferences for the Democratic and Republican parties' respective nominees for president. Registered members of each party only voted in their party's primary, while voters who were unaffiliated chose any one primary in which to vote.

Trump won the election in the Volunteer State with 60.7% of the vote. Clinton received 34.7% of the vote. This is the largest margin of victory for a presidential candidate for either party in the state since 1972 with Richard Nixon, and also the first time since that either party has earned over 60% of the vote in Tennessee. Tennessee was one of eleven states won by Bill Clinton in 1992 and 1996 but lost by Hillary Clinton.

Primary elections

Democratic primary

 Results

Republican primary

Polling

General election

Voting History
Tennessee has not voted for a Democratic presidential nominee since 1996. In 2012, Republican nominee Mitt Romney won the state by a margin of more than twenty points, due to the unpopularity of the Obama administration in the conservative state. Typically Democrats do very well in the urban regions of Memphis and Nashville, while Republicans dominate the rural and suburban areas. Tennessee is considered a safe Republican state. In 2016, it stayed that way with Trump winning the state with 60.7% of the vote.

Predictions
CNN: Solid Trump
Cook Political Report: Solid Trump
Electoral-vote.com: Likely Trump
Los Angeles Times: Solid Trump
NBC: Likely Trump^
RealClearPolitics: Likely Trump
Sabato's Crystal Ball: Safe Trump

^Highest rating given

Results

By congressional district
Trump won 7 of 9 congressional districts.

By county

Counties that flipped from Democratic to Republican
Hardeman (largest city: Bolivar)

See also

 2016 Democratic Party presidential debates and forums
 2016 Democratic Party presidential primaries
 2016 Republican Party presidential debates and forums
 2016 Republican Party presidential primaries

References

External links
 RNC 2016 Republican Nominating Process 
 Green papers for 2016 primaries, caucuses, and conventions
 Decision Desk Headquarter Results for Tennessee

TN
2016
Presidential